The epicranium is the medical term for the collection of structures covering the cranium. It consists of the muscles, aponeurosis, and skin.

References 

Skull